Jenaro Pindú (1946–1993) was a prominent cartoonist, sculptor and architect of Paraguay. He was a student of Hermann Guggiari, one of the best-known Paraguayan sculptors of the twentieth century.

Trajectory

His long career in the Paraguayan art world stretched from 1966 until 1983. 
    
{| class="wikitable sortable"
|- bgColor="#ffffff"
|Year|||Activities resaltantes 
|------- 
| 1966 
| Participation in "Plastica Paraguaya", a contest organized by the Paraguayan American Cultural Center, CCPA, in the "John F. Kennedy" Gallery and the first public auction of sculptures in the same cultural center. 
|--------- 
| 1967 
| Participation in the Ninth Biennial of St. Paul. 
Exhibition at the Yacht Club San Bernardino. 
Displays in the Paraguayan Red Cross Center. 
Illustration of the book of poetry, BAM and sculpture displays in the halls of CEPRO.
|--------- 
| 1968 
| Realization of the " Poetic Audiovisual" 
Participation in the "Paraguayans Artists" exhibition at the Club Concepcion. 
Collective exhibition at the Cultural Center of Villarrica.
Illustration and publishing of his poems in the magazine "Today" and exhibition of paintings, prints and sculpture at Goethe College. 
|--------- 
| 1969 
| Participation in the collective exhibition in the Ypacarai Public Library. 
Participation in the "Paraguayan Artists" exhibition at CCPA. 
Participation in "Art 69" in the YMCA. 
Illustrators of "Bridge over the Tapecué" 
|--------- 
| 1970 
| Individual exhibition in Miro Gallery and collective exhibition in the House Argentina 
|--------- 
| 1972 
| Exhibition of painting and sculpture at the Faculty of Philosophy of National University of Asuncion. 
Participation in "Sculpture Today" at the Central Bank of Paraguay and collective exhibition in the CCPA. 
|--------- 
| 1973 
| Exhibition of the Paraguayan Sample Theatre in the Brazilian Cultural Mission
|--------- 
| 1975 
| Participation in the Exhibition of the Paraguayan Sample at CCPA
|--------- 
| 1976 
| Collective exhibition in the Gallery in Latin American, "Current Drawing of Paraguay" in the Art-sans Gallery.
Exhibition of Graphic Arts of the Americas (XXVIII tribute to the anniversary of the Charter of the OEA) in the CCPA. 
Participation in the exhibition Paraguayan Sample Theater at the Centro Cultural Juan de Salazar 
|--------- 
| 1977 
| Participation in the Second Biennial (Uruguay) and "Drawing and Printmaking in Paraguay" at the Centro Cultural Juan de Salazar 
|--------- 
| 1978 
| "Image / Message of Latin America" at the Cultural Center of Villeparis (France). 
"Catastrophic Art" at the Art-sans Gallery. 
Collective Exhibition in Sepia Gallery. 
Exhibition "Paraguayans Artists" at the Metropolitan Seminar of Asuncion
|--------- 
|1979 
| Participation at the Third Biennial of Maldonado (Uruguay). 
Displays of the journalists' association of Paraguay in the CCPA. 
"Paraguayan Illustrators" at the Museum of Folk Art and Contemporary Art of Paraguay Villeta. 
Collective exhibition at the Gallery Aristos. 
"Paraguayan Plastic Art in Hispanic Heritage Week" at the Institute of Hispanic Culture of Guaira Villarrica. 
Collective exhibition at the Art-sans Gallery. 
"The 70's and Drawing in Paraguay" in the CCPA. 
Exhibition and Auction to benefit Neuropsychiatric Hospital of Asuncion in the Sepia Gallery. 
"Paraguayan Sculpture and ceramics " CCPA
|--------- 
| 1980 
| "Paraguayan Artists" at the Museo Brazilian House of Sao Paulo. 
"Ten graphic artists of Paraguay" in the halls of the OEA in Washington, D.C. (USA). 
"Retrospective 1966-1980" at CCPA. 
Individual shows in the Art-sans Gallery 
|--------- 
| 1981 
| Collective exhibition at the City of Pirayú. 
"Paraguayan Artists" in the Paraguayan Center of Engineers. 
Shows individual in the Sepia Gallery and Solo exhibition at the Gallery Status.
|--------- 
| 1983 
| "The engravings of Jenaro Pindú" at the Art-sans Gallery 
|--------- 
|}

Ticio Escobar, the most important art critic in Paraguay, wrote about Pindú in 1983: "Today is already almost a truism to say that the 70's began with a predominance of drawing and the exhibition in the Gallery Pindú Miro may serve as the parameter and the beginning of that heyday… "

Livio Abramo, a master engraver, said: "... Pindú is one of the most capable artists of Paraguay-current, lyrical and dramatic at the same time-creating architectural structures laden with symbolism and transforming the human sense of latent, tight aggressiveness that comes from your subconscious in a world where his art, already solidly mature, provides us with an unexpected surprise and lyrical visions."

Distinctions  
He received, among other major awards, the following: "Honorable Mention" in the Visual Arts Competition ACFA (1966), "Second Prize" in the Story Contest organized by the newspaper La Tribuna (1973); "Award for Guest Honor" at the Second Biennial Maldonado (Uruguay) (1977) and" Grand Prix" at the Third Biennial Maldonado (1979)

Works  
He was a prolific artist, and his collection of ink drawings and engravings is huge. Most of these samples of his talent have no title and are in major museums Paraguay and the world and in private collections.

As an architect he designed both homes and commercial buildings that are both intrinsically works of art while retaining a distinct style and daring.

References 
 Cultural Center of the Republic El Cabildo
 Biographical Dictionary "FORGERS OF PARAGUAY," First Edicción January 2000. Distributed editions of Quevedo. Buenos Aires, Argentina.
 Enciclopedia Virtual Paraguaya - Portal

External links 
 [ the Circle Gallery]
 

1946 births
1993 deaths
People from Asunción
Paraguayan sculptors
Paraguayan architects
20th-century sculptors
20th-century Paraguayan architects